Anita Irfan (born 9 August 1967) is a Pakistani politician who was a Member of the Provincial Assembly of Balochistan, from October 2016 to May 2018.

Early life and education
Irfan was born on 9 August 1967.

She has a Bachelor of Art degree.

Political career

Irfan was elected to the Provincial Assembly of Balochistan as a candidate of Pakistan Muslim League (N) on a reserved seat for minority in October 2016. The seat was vacated due to the de-seating of Santosh Kumar.

References

Living people
Pakistan Muslim League (N) politicians
1967 births